Events from the year 1825 in Ireland.

Events
9 March – the Unlawful Societies (Ireland) Act proscribes both the Catholic Association and the Orange Order.
May – the British Ordnance Survey begins its survey of Ireland.
27 June – the Excise Licences Act raises Irish excise licences to bring them in line with those of Great Britain.
Foundation of the Provincial Bank of Ireland.
Portlaw in County Waterford is established as a model village by the Malcomson family, Quaker cotton mill owners.
Paddle steamers (Dasher and Arrow) first introduced on the Portpatrick to Donaghadee packet service.
Over 1,800 Irish residents leave Cork to emigrate to Peterborough, Ontario, Canada, in a scheme administered by Canadian trader and politician Peter Robinson.

Arts and literature
April – the first series of Tales by the O'Hara Family, by John and Michael Banim, is published.
May – the Royal Hibernian Academy holds its first exhibition of art in Dublin.
Thomas Crofton Croker publishes the first volumes of his Fairy Legends and Traditions of the South of Ireland.
Charles Maturin's novel Leixlip Castle is published posthumously.
William Hamilton Maxwell's military adventure novel O'Hara is published.
Sydney, Lady Morgan, publishes Absenteeism.

Births
26 January – James Stephens, founding member of the Fenian Brotherhood movement (died 1901).
13 April – D'Arcy McGee, journalist and politician in Canada (assassinated 1868).
16 May
Valentine Browne, 4th Earl of Kenmare, peer (died 1905).
John McGovern, soldier, recipient of the Victoria Cross for gallantry in 1857 at Delhi, India (died 1888).
17 June – Richard Harte Keatinge, recipient of the Victoria Cross for gallantry in 1858 at Chundairee, India (died 1904).
4 November – Frederick Dobson Middleton, British Army general and commander of the Canadian Militia in the North-West Rebellion (died 1898).
Full date unknown
William Dowling, soldier, recipient of the Victoria Cross for gallantry in 1857 at Lucknow, India (died 1887).
Myles O'Reilly, Catholic soldier and writer (died 1880).

Deaths
6 February – John Connolly, second bishop of the Roman Catholic diocese of New York (born 1750).
22 August – Richard Hely-Hutchinson, 1st Earl of Donoughmore, politician (born 1756).
John Templeton, naturalist and botanist (born 1766).

References

 
Years of the 19th century in Ireland
1820s in Ireland
Ireland
 Ireland